is a Japanese gymnast.

References

External links
 
 
 

1985 births
Living people
Japanese male artistic gymnasts
Olympic gymnasts of Japan
Gymnasts at the 2008 Summer Olympics
Olympic silver medalists for Japan
Nippon Sport Science University alumni
Medalists at the World Artistic Gymnastics Championships
Olympic medalists in gymnastics
Medalists at the 2008 Summer Olympics
Universiade medalists in gymnastics
Universiade gold medalists for Japan
Medalists at the 2009 Summer Universiade
20th-century Japanese people
21st-century Japanese people